At the end of 2017, there were total 7,450 breweries in the United States, including 7,346 craft breweries subdivided into 2,594 brewpubs, 4,522 microbreweries, 230 regional craft breweries and 104 large/non-craft breweries.  From 2017 data, according to the Beer Institute, the beer industry generated a nearly 2.33 million jobs in brewing, distribution and supply which had a combined economic impact of more than $350 billion.  , the U.S. state with the highest number of craft breweries per capita was Vermont, with 1 brewery for every 24,067 people.

Breweries by state

List of breweries in Alabama
List of breweries in Alaska
List of breweries in Arizona
List of breweries in Arkansas
List of breweries in California
List of breweries in San Diego County, California
List of breweries in Colorado
List of breweries in Connecticut
List of breweries in Delaware
List of breweries in Florida
List of breweries in Georgia
List of breweries in Hawaii
List of breweries in Idaho
List of breweries in Illinois
List of breweries in Indiana
List of breweries in Iowa
List of breweries in Kansas
List of breweries in Kentucky
List of breweries in Louisiana
List of breweries in Maine
List of breweries in Maryland
List of breweries in Massachusetts
List of breweries in Michigan
List of breweries in Minnesota
List of breweries in Mississippi
List of breweries in Missouri
List of breweries in Montana
List of breweries in Nebraska
List of breweries in Nevada
List of breweries in New Hampshire
List of breweries in New Jersey
List of breweries in New Mexico
List of breweries in New York
List of breweries in North Carolina
List of breweries in North Dakota
List of breweries in Ohio
List of breweries in Oklahoma
List of breweries in Oregon
List of breweries in Pennsylvania
List of breweries in Rhode Island
List of breweries in South Carolina
List of breweries in South Dakota
List of breweries in Tennessee
List of breweries in Texas
List of breweries in Utah
List of breweries in Vermont
List of breweries in Virginia
List of breweries in Washington
List of breweries in Washington, D.C.
List of breweries in West Virginia
List of breweries in Wisconsin
List of brewers in Milwaukee County, Wisconsin
List of breweries in Wyoming

See also
 Beer and breweries by region
 Beer in the United States
 List of microbreweries
 List of defunct breweries in the United States

Notes

 
American cuisine-related lists

Lists of companies of the United States by industry